Arcadia is a town in Oklahoma County, Oklahoma, United States, and a part of the Oklahoma City metropolitan area. The population was 247 at the 2010 census, a decrease of 11.5 percent from the figure of 279 in 2000.

History
Arcadia was established soon after the Land Rush of 1889 and drew both white and African American cotton farmers, who named the land after the Greek town of Arcadia. A post office was established in 1890. The Missouri, Kansas and Texas Railroad constructed a line in 1902-3 from Bartlesville to Oklahoma City, passing immediately south of Arcadia.

The town thrived as an agricultural community in the early 20th century. Located near the Deep Fork River, the soil was well suited to producing cotton. The local newspaper, the Arcadia Star, claimed Arcadia had a population of 800 in 1904. However, the U.S. census of 1900 counted only 706 in Deep Fork Township, which included Arcadia. The census at statehood in 1907 registered 994 persons in Arcadia.

In June 1924, fire destroyed most of the business district. One building, Tulon's Drugstore, survived and is now listed in the National Register of Historic Places.

Voters resisted incorporation attempts in the 1930s and again in 1980. Sentiment changed after Edmond, Oklahoma attempted to annex the community in 1984-85, and Arcadia finally incorporated in 1987.

Geography

Demographics

As of the census of 2010, there were 247 people living in the town. The population density was 185 people per square mile (69.9/km2). The racial makeup of the town was 57.89% African American, 23.89% White, 7.29% Native American, 0.81% from other races, and 10.12% from two or more races. Hispanic or Latino of any race were 2.43% of the population.

There were 108 households, out of which 23.1% had children under the age of 18 living with them, 51.7% were married couples living together, 18.5% had a female householder with no husband present, and 35.2% were non-families. 30.6% of all households were made up of individuals, and 13.0% had someone living alone who was 65 years of age or older. The average household size was 2.31 and the average family size was 2.90.

In the town, the population was spread out, with 28.3% under the age of 18, 6.5% from 18 to 24, 20.4% from 25 to 44, 28.3% from 45 to 64, and 16.5% who were 65 years of age or older. The median age was 42 years. For every 100 females, there were 111.4 males. For every 100 females age 18 and over, there were 98.0 males.

The median income for a household in the town was $24,359, and the median income for a family was $27,083. Males had a median income of $22,500 versus $25,625 for females. The per capita income for the town was $15,722. About 10.9% of families and 29.8% of the population were below the poverty line, including 26.8% of those under the age of eighteen and 20.5% of those 65 or over.

Economy
Residents who are still employed generally commute to other communities for work, primarily in Oklahoma City.

References

External links

 Information, photos and videos on TravelOK.com Official travel and tourism website for the State of Oklahoma
 Encyclopedia of Oklahoma History and Culture - "Arcadia"

Oklahoma City metropolitan area
Towns in Oklahoma County, Oklahoma
Towns in Oklahoma
Populated places established in 1890
Enclaves in the United States